Dos Castillas is a station on Line 2 of the Metro Ligero, servicing Madrid, Spain. It is located in fare Zone B1.

References 

Madrid Metro Ligero stations
Buildings and structures in Pozuelo de Alarcón
Railway stations in Spain opened in 2007